{{DISPLAYTITLE:C10H8O2}}
The molecular formula C10H8O2 may refer to:
 1,5-Dihydroxynaphthalene, one of several isomers of dihydroxynaphthalene
 Methylcoumarin, isomer in which a methyl group substitutes for a hydrogen atom in coumarin